Visa requirements for Saint Vincent and the Grenadines citizens are administrative entry restrictions by the authorities of other states placed on citizens of Saint Vincent and the Grenadines. As of 2 July 2019, Saint Vincent and the Grenadines citizens had visa-free or visa on arrival access to 150 countries and territories, ranking the Saint Vincent and the Grenadines passport 29 in terms of travel freedom according to the Henley Passport Index.

Saint Vincent and the Grenadines signed a mutual visa waiver agreement with Schengen Area countries on 28 May 2015.

Visa requirements map

Visa requirements

Dependent, Disputed, or Restricted territories
Unrecognised or partially recognised countries

Dependent and autonomous territories

Vaccination
Many African countries, including Angola, Benin, Burkina Faso, Cameroon, Central African Republic, Chad, Democratic Republic of the Congo, Republic of the Congo, Côte d'Ivoire, Equatorial Guinea, Gabon, Ghana, Guinea, Liberia, Mali, Mauritania, Niger, Rwanda, São Tomé and Príncipe, Senegal, Sierra Leone, Uganda, Zambia require all incoming passengers to have a current International Certificate of Vaccination. Some other countries require vaccination only if the passenger is coming from an infected area.

Fingerprinting
Several countries including Argentina, Cambodia, Japan, Malaysia, Saudi Arabia, South Korea and the United States demand all passengers to be fingerprinted on arrival.

Passport validity
Many countries require passport validity of no less than 6 months and one or two blank pages. Countries requiring passport validity of at least 6 months on arrival include Afghanistan, Algeria, Bhutan, Botswana, Brunei, Cambodia,  Comoros, Côte d'Ivoire, Ecuador, Egypt, El Salvador, Fiji, Guyana, Indonesia, Iran, Iraq (except when arriving at Basra - 3 months and Erbil or Sulaimaniyah - on arrival), Israel, Kenya, Laos, Madagascar, Malaysia, Marshall Islands, Myanmar, Namibia, Nicaragua, Nigeria, Oman, Palau, Papua New Guinea, Philippines, Rwanda, Saint Lucia, Samoa, Saudi Arabia, Singapore, Solomon Islands, Sri Lanka, Suriname, Taiwan, Tanzania, Timor-Leste, Tonga, Tuvalu, Uganda, Vanuatu, Venezuela, Vietnam, countries requiring passport validity of at least 4 months on arrival include Micronesia, Zambia, countries requiring passport validity of at least 3 months on arrival include Georgia, Honduras, Iceland, Jordan, Kuwait, Lebanon, Moldova, Nauru, Panama, United Arab Emirates and countries requiring passport validity of at least 1 month on arrival include Eritrea, Hong Kong, Macao, New Zealand, South Africa. Other countries require either a passport valid on arrival or passport valid throughout the period of intended stay.

See also
Visa policy of Saint Vincent and the Grenadines
Saint Vincent and the Grenadines passport

References and Notes
References

Notes

Saint Vincent and the Grenadines
Foreign relations of Saint Vincent and the Grenadines